A bonus stage (also known as a bonus level, bonus round, or special stage) is a special level within a video game designed to reward the player or players, and typically allows the player to collect extra points or power-ups. Bonus stage either have no enemies or hazards, or replace the normal penalties for being struck by enemies or hazards with simply being thrown out of the bonus stage. Many bonus stages need to be activated or discovered in some manner, or certain conditions must be satisfied to access them. Otherwise, they may appear after the player has completed a certain number of regular stages. They are often much shorter than regular stages.

Unlike most regular stages, a bonus stage does not normally have to be completed to move on. While a regular stage must be replayed until completion, possibly using up lives or continues upon failures, when a player begins a bonus stage they have one chance at it. Some bonus stages do contain an end location or condition to reach, but regardless of whether the player succeeds or fails, game play resumes at the next regular stage after one attempt. Other bonus stages have no end to reach, the player must simply survive as long as they can before inevitably failing at some point. Some bonus stages have a short time limit, where the player must either complete the stage before the time runs out, or simply survive until the clock runs down to zero. As bonus stages are often shorter and over in one attempt, players cannot as easily practice and perfect their play through of them in the same way as regular stages that permit or demand more attempts upon failure.

Namco's 1980 arcade game Rally-X was one of the first to feature a bonus stage. In some games, bonus stages have an interface and game paradigm that is completely different from the rest of the game, as in the slot machine bonus stage of Super Mario Bros. 2. Other bonus stages use the same gaming paradigm as the rest of the game, as in the car smashing bonus stage of Street Fighter II, or the bonus stages in Super Monkey Ball, where players collect bananas to earn extra points and lives.

References

Video game gameplay
Video game terminology